Kerry-Anne Guse and Akemi Nishiya were the defending champions, but none competed this year.

Alexia Dechaume and Florencia Labat won the title by defeating Sandra Cecchini and Laura Garrone 7–6(8–6), 7–5 in the final.

Seeds

Draw

Draw

References

External links
 Official results archive (ITF)
 Official results archive (WTA)

WTA San Marino
WTA San Marino